KJCS-LD, virtual channel 38 (UHF digital channel 14), is a low-powered religious television station licensed to Colorado Springs, Colorado, United States. Between 1998 and 2011, it rebroadcast Daystar. As of December 2012, it is in digital, and simulcasting Denver's KDEO-LD (channel 23) and its subchannels; along with that station, it was sold by Catholic Television Apostolate to Simchat Torah Beit Midrash in 2015. In 2019, KJCS moved from channel 38 to channel 14.

The transmitter is located near the peak of Almagre Mountain South, at an elevation of approximately 12,340 feet.

References 

 (FCC license info)
(KDEO info with subchannel list and programming)
(old KJCS website, which shows when it went dark 6/22/2011)

External links 
  KDEO website

JCS-LD
Low-power television stations in the United States